The 2012 Porsche Mobil 1 Supercup season was the 20th Porsche Supercup season. It began on 21 April on Bahrain International Circuit and finished on 9 September at Autodromo Nazionale Monza, after ten scheduled races.

Teams and drivers

Race calendar and results
On 20 October 2011 the series schedule was announced, consisting of ten races at nine circuits. Sakhir will return and replaces the round at the Yas Marina Circuit. Following the 4 May incident at Fuji International Speedway during the 500km Super GT event that severely injured Porsche driver Tim Bergmeister, an investigation of the crash and numerous wheel failures found during the Barcelona round led to officials moving the round to the Hungaroring, making that round a two-race weekend, with the replacement race on Saturday and the regular round on Sunday.

Championship standings

Drivers' Championship

† — Drivers did not finish the race, but were classified as they completed over 90% of the race distance.

References

External links
The Porsche Mobil 1 Supercup website
Porsche Mobil 1 Supercup Online Magazine

Porsche Supercup seasons
Porsche Supercup